Liechtenstein competed at the 1980 Winter Olympics in Lake Placid, United States.

Medalists

Alpine skiing

Men

Women

Luge

Men

(Men's) Doubles

References
Official Olympic Reports
International Olympic Committee results database
 Olympic Winter Games 1980, full results by sports-reference.com

Nations at the 1980 Winter Olympics
1980
1980 in Liechtenstein